8XM is a Pakistani music television channel, on air since July 2011. 8XM airs all types of music, old and new, Bollywood, Hollywood and Lollywood songs. It also entertains listeners with jokes related to animated cartoons. It is a Licensed Content music channel in Pakistan. It launched after the 9XM Indian music channel.

Sponsored Programming
Always Karo Yaqeen
Battle of the Bands
Coke Studio
Commander Safeguard
Easypaisa Raahi
Dettol Warriors
Miss Veet
Miss Veet 2
Sprite Spice Wars
Telenor IChamp
Veet Miss Super Model 3
Veet Miss Super Model 4
Veet Miss Super Model 5
Veet Celebration of Beauty 2013

See also 
 List of music channels in Pakistan

References

External links

Music organisations based in Pakistan
Music television channels
Television stations in Lahore
Television stations in Pakistan
Television channels and stations established in 2011